Jekyll and Hyde...Together Again is a 1982 sex comedy based on the 1886 novella Strange Case of Dr. Jekyll and Mr. Hyde by Robert Louis Stevenson and stars Mark Blankfield, Bess Armstrong, Tim Thomerson, Krista Errickson, Cassandra Peterson, and Michael McGuire.

Plot
A group of medical students observe Dr. Daniel Jekyll perform brain surgery at Our Lady of Pain and Suffering Hospital in Los Angeles, California. Hubert Howes, the world's richest man, watches a recording of the procedure from his hospital bed, hoping to recruit Jekyll to perform the world's first "total transplant," replacing every organ at once. Howes threatens to blow up the hospital if his procedure does not occur as planned. Dr. Carew, hospital overseer and Jekyll's future father-in-law, forbids Jekyll from marrying his daughter, Mary, if he does not comply with Howes' wishes.

Jekyll attends to patients in the charity ward when Mary visits, complaining that he missed their lunch date because he was working. Dr. Knute Lanyon flirts with Mary. After Mary leaves, a patient named Ivy Venus flirts with Jekyll and invites him to visit her at the nightclub where she works.

Later, Jekyll returns to his work, measuring two white powders on a square mirror. Exhausted and unable to focus, he drops the powders on the table. He falls asleep and accidentally inhales the powder, causing him to transform. With an air of wild confidence, he bags more of the powdered drug, steals a car, and drives to Ivy's club. After Ivy performs onstage, she takes him to her room backstage and undresses. He introduces himself as "Hyde" and they have sex. The next morning, Jekyll, regretting his actions, declares his unwavering love to Mary.

Over the next few days, Jekyll makes various attempts to dispose of his drug, but always ends up deciding to inhale more, which leads to comical and sexually charged exploits.

Jekyll wins a research grant, and is invited to a ceremony in London, England. Hoping to use the money to buy Ivy's affection, Hyde finds her at an arcade and invites her to accompany him on his trip. Ivy says she prefers Jekyll to Hyde. When he reveals that they are both the same man, she does not believe him; in his frustration, he destroys an arcade game, and Ivy is electrocuted. Hyde travels to Los Angeles International Airport and climbs onto the back of an airplane headed for London. Ivy revives and travels to London via train vowing her revenge.

At the ceremony, actor George Chakiris accepts the award on the doctor's behalf, declaring that the remaining vial of Jekyll's substance will be donated. Hyde swings down from the balcony, grabbing the microphone and singing. Realizing that Hyde is the same man as her fiancé, Mary becomes aroused by his new personality. Hyde removes his pants, runs out of the hall and is chased through the foggy streets by the audience members. Ivy joins the crowd, and they follow him until he falls off the side of a building. As Ivy and Mary kneel next to Hyde's body, he transforms back into Jekyll. Upon waking, he claims that the drugs have exposed the two sides of his split personality. Mary desires Hyde, while Ivy wants Jekyll, and the two women drag him through a cemetery, agreeing to work out an arrangement.

Nearby, the skeletal corpse of Robert Louis Stevenson rolls over in its grave.

Cast

Production
In spring of 1981, word of an impending strike by the Directors Guild of America reached the studio heads at Paramount. Michael Eisner and Barry Diller decided to expedite production of several low-budget films in order to have product ready for distribution should the strike occur. Eisner and head of production Don Simpson each chose a few screenplays they personally liked and thought could be produced cheaply and quickly. Jekyll and Hyde...Together Again was one of Eisner's choices, along with White Dog and I'm Dancing As Fast As I Can.

Release
The film was given a theatrical release in the United States by Paramount Pictures in October 1982. It grossed $3,792,188 and was considered a box-office bomb.

References

External links
 
 

1982 films
1980s black comedy films
American black comedy films
American comedy horror films
Dr. Jekyll and Mr. Hyde films
1980s English-language films
Films about drugs
Films directed by Jerry Belson
Films scored by Barry De Vorzon
Films with screenplays by Monica Johnson
Paramount Pictures films
Films with screenplays by Jerry Belson
1982 comedy films
1980s American films